John Rothwell (1 October 1913 – 22 May 2005) was an Australian cricketer. He played four first-class matches for Tasmania between 1933 and 1934.

References

External links
 

1913 births
2005 deaths
Australian cricketers
Tasmania cricketers
Cricketers from Hobart